Petar Angelov (Macedonian: Петар Ангелов) (born 8 March 1977) is a Macedonian handball player who plays for RK Vardar Negotino.

Honors
 Macedonian Handball Super League 
Winners  (8)
RK Pelister 2000,2005 
RK Metalurg Skopje 2010,2011,2012
RK Vardar 2015,2016,2017
 Macedonian Handball Cup 
Winners  (7)
RK Pelister 2005 
RK Metalurg Skopje 2010,2011,2013
RK Vardar 2015,2016,2017
 SEHA League
RK Metalurg Skopje:Finalist  : 2012
RK Metalurg Skopje:3rd  : 2013
RK Vardar Winner (2): 2013–14, 2016–17

European 
EHF Challenge Cup
RK Pelister  2nd:: 2001–02
 EHF Champions League 
RK Vardar Winner (1): 2016–17

International
 IHF Super Globe
RK Vardar Third placed: 2017

References

Living people
1977 births
Sportspeople from Kavadarci
Macedonian male handball players